Kwadwo Adu Genfi Amponsah (born 4 January 1993), known professionally as Kojey Radical, is a British music artist, creative director and mixed media visual artist. His style has been described as a mix of grime-y hip hop, alternative rap and spoken word. Since 2018, he has received six nominations at the MOBO Awards, including Best Newcomer. He also performed at the 2020 and 2022 MOBOs ceremonies.

Early life
Radical was raised in Shoreditch and Hoxton, London, the son of Ghanaian immigrants. He began as a spoken word poet and mixed media illustrator, graduating from London College of Fashion with a First Class Honours Bachelor of Arts degree in Fashion Illustration.

Career

2014–2016: Dear Daisy: Opium and career beginnings
In 2014, Radical released his first musical project Dear Daisy: Opium just after graduating. Media commentators stated Dear Daisy was Radical's first music project in which he touched on topics of love, social media and religion. It spawned from a book with the same name Radical was illustrating during his time at university. Radical linked up with UK artist and producer Jay Prince, who produced Radical's first official record, The Garden Party. Radical followed up with a record called "Bambu", which subsequently became the first single on his sophomore EP, 23Winters. Bambu made use of blackface, a persona Radical would later adopt in majority of his early visuals.

After supporting Young Fathers on tour, Radical later released "Open Hand" a record that saw him adopt a much more political stance in his music. premiering the visual at Tate Britain in 2015. Radical aimed to offer an alternative outlook on socio-political issues. He later followed up with a record called "Kwame Nkrumah" before releasing the 23Winters EP in February 2016. "Kwame Nkrumah" was written in honour of the first Ghanaian president and Ghana's independence.

The 23Winters EP was a personal analysis of a relationship between father and son, with themes of religion, society, family, love, new-age revolution and African diaspora narrated by Kojey's father. The project includes production from KZ The Producer, Fwdslxsh, Lupus Cain, Mike Keyz, Selvsse, Niels Kirk & New Machine as well as collaborations from Tom Grenan, Ray Blk & Bobii Lewis. It has been described as "a supreme phonic proclamation of one’s ethnicity, history, and future." In an interview with The Source Magazine Radical stated his intention was to "...create a body of work that voices my ideas and philosophies while also offering another sense of perspective... " 23Winters also saw Kojey nominated for two MOBO Awards, one for Best Newcomer and one for Best Video. The project independently debuted in 3rd position in the Rap & Hip Hop Albums Charts and also entered the UK top 40.

2017–present: In Gods Body and Cashmere Tears
In 2017, Radical returned with his third EP, In Gods Body. It includes features from Shola Ama, Ghetts, Tamera Foster, Miloh Smith, dance music producer Potè, Obongjayar and British actress and screenwriter, Michaela Coel. Coel recites a poem written by Kojey that serves as a central narration to the project.

Media commentators stated the project was a continuation of 23Winters, honing in on some of the messages recited by Radical's father and developed into a journey of self-discovery. Radical deconstructed the politics of black identity and race while introducing conversations about sexuality and love. Since the release of 23Winters, Radical has toured the world independently playing in Australia, New Zealand, Brazil, South Africa, Russia, and Europe. Radical has a long-lasting brand relationship has been with Adidas, which began in 2017. In 2018, Radical collaborated with Mahalia on her single, "Water", which was also featured in the soundtrack for the video game FIFA 19. This was followed up with another collaboration with the Leicester-born musician on the single, "One Night Only." The track went onto feature on Mahalia's EP, Seasons. During the same period, Radical and MJ Cole collaborated on the track, "Soak It Up." Radical and Adidas teamed up to create a short film about mental health and depression alongside director Max Luz and international fashion platform, SSense.

Away from music, in 2019 Radical was responsible for the bottle design of the spirits brand, 1800 Tequila. In late 2019, Radical released his fourth EP, Cashmere Tears. In the review by magazine NME it received five out of five stars and was described as a "tale of deeply emotional tales of everyday life". In January 2020, it was announced that Radical would be teaming up with US-musician Mereba on his single, "Same Boat".

Radical was a nominee at the MOBO Awards in 2020 following a two-year break of the ceremony in the Best Video category. Subsequently, he was announced in the British media as one of the headline performances at the ceremony in December 2020. He released the single "Good" in late 2020, which was part of a wider collaboration with Sony and the use of 360 Reality Audio.

Discography

Studio albums
 Reason to Smile (2022)

Extended plays
 Dear Daisy: Opium (2014)
 23Winters (2016)
 In Gods Body (2017)
 Cashmere Tears (2019)

Awards and nominations

References

External links

1993 births
Living people
Black British male rappers
British spoken word artists
English people of Ghanaian descent
People from Hoxton
People from Shoreditch
Rappers from London
Alumni of the London College of Fashion